Josep Antoni is the name of:

Josep Antoni Noya, Spanish footballer
Josep Antoni Duran i Lleida, Spanish politician
Josep Antoni Coderch, Spanish architect
Josep Antoni Fernández i Fernández, Spanish comic book artist